Topisaw is an unincorporated community in Pike County, in the U.S. state of Mississippi.

History
The community takes its name from Topisaw Creek, which flows near the site. A variant name is "Carters Creek". A post office called Topisaw was established in 1880, and remained in operation until 1905.

References

Unincorporated communities in Mississippi
Unincorporated communities in Pike County, Mississippi
Mississippi placenames of Native American origin